The 2016 Acht van Westerveld was the tenth running of the women's Drentse Acht van Westerveld, a women's bicycle race. It was rated by the UCI as a 1.2 category race.

Result

References

Acht van Westerveld
Acht van Westerveld
Ronde van Drenthe (women's race)